The US Academic Bee and Bowl (USABB) are all-subject, buzzer-based quiz competitions for elementary and middle school students. The US Academic Bee is for individuals, while the US Academic Bowl—similar to high school quiz bowl—is intended for teams, though individuals can opt to compete as a team of one. USABB was founded in the 2015–2016 season by David and Nolwenn Madden and is overseen by International Academic Competitions (IAC). These competitions are closely associated with other IAC tournaments at the middle and elementary level, particularly the National Science Bee and National Humanities Bee.

US Academic Bee

Format and Rules

The US Academic Bee has four divisions: 8th Grade, 7th Grade, 6th Grade, and Elementary. For 8th and 7th grade competitors, there are 30 questions per round; for 6th graders and below, there are 25 questions per round. Each question in the bee is pyramidal, meaning the question begins with obscure facts and ends with more common knowledge. A student leaves the round once they reach 6 points; additional bonus points are added to their final score depending on when they exit the round.

For any question, there can be up to three answer attempts. If a student is the third person to interrupt the reader with an incorrect answer, they lose a point. The first two incorrect interrupts and any response after the moderator has finished reading have no penalty. With the exception of the question number, these rules are nearly identical to those of other IAC tournaments.

Students who finish in the top 50% of competitors at Regionals are eligible for the National Championships.

Question Distribution

The distribution of the 30 questions per round is as follows:

US Academic Bee National Champions

Middle School Champions

Elementary School Champions

US Academic Bowl

Format and Rules

The US Academic Bowl has two divisions: Middle School and Elementary School. Middle school division teams are permitted to have students in 6th grade and younger compete, but elementary school division teams must consist entirely of players in 6th grade and below.

In a round of the Bowl, two teams of up to 4 players compete head-to-head. Each half of the match consists of 8 tossups, each with 3 bonus questions. Each correct response earns a team 10 points. However, an early enough buzz on a tossup—before the so-called power mark (*)—will earn a team 20 points. No points are deducted for incorrect responses. If a team correctly answers a tossup, that team receives the opportunity to answer the bonuses. Any bonuses they miss are read to the opposing team, who can earn "bounceback" points for correct responses.

Separating the halves is a sixty-second round with three available categories: Literature, History & Geography, and Science. The trailing team is allowed to choose a category first and receives, as per the name of the round, 60 seconds to answer up to 6 questions. Any questions the team gets incorrect are then given to the other team.

Teammates are not allowed to confer on tossup questions but can do so on bonuses and during the 60-second round. Five preliminary rounds of the Bowl are played before determining the teams that advance to the playoffs.

Teams who finish in the top half of participants; score at least a 0.500 winning percentage; or win at least one playoff game at any Regional Tournament are eligible for the National Championships.

Question Distribution

The distribution of the 16 tossups, 16 bonus questions, and 3 sixty-second rounds is as follows:

US Academic Bowl National Champions

Middle School Division

Elementary School Division

See also
 National Science Bee
 United States Geography Championships
 International Academic Competitions
 National History Bee and Bowl
 International History Olympiad
 International Geography Bee

References

Education competitions in the United States
2010 establishments in the United States
International Academic Competitions